Larry Augustin (born October 10, 1962) is a VP at Amazon Web Services.  He formerly was the chairman of the board of directors of SugarCRM. He is a former venture capitalist and the founder of VA Software (now Geeknet). During the height of the dot-com bubble, Augustin was a billionaire on paper at the age of 38.

Augustin is featured in the 2001 documentary film Revolution OS.

Early life and education
Augustin grew up in a suburb of Dayton, Ohio, though he spent some of his early life on a family farm in New Hampshire.

After receiving a B.S. in electrical engineering from the University of Notre Dame, Augustin received a fellowship from Bell Labs to pursue a master's degree in electrical engineering from Stanford University. He went to work for Bell Labs for a year and then returned to Stanford to pursue a PhD.

Career
In 1993, Augustin founded VA Research (later VA Linux and Geeknet), while a Ph.D. student at Stanford. Augustin was a Stanford colleague of Jerry Yang and David Filo, the founders of Yahoo!. Filo and Yang introduced Augustin to Sequoia Capital, which provided Augustin with venture capital.

In November 1999, he launched SourceForge, a collaborative development environment or "forge".

On December 9, 1999, during the dot-com bubble, VA Linux became a public company via an initial public offering and Augustin, then 38-years old, became a billionaire on paper.

In August 2002, Augustin left VA Linux and from September 2002 to December 2004, he was a partner at Azure Capital Partners, where he helped lead Azure's investments in Zend Technologies and Medsphere.

In 2005, Augustin joined the board of directors of SugarCRM and in May 2009, Augustin was appointed as the chief executive officer.

Augustin was the CEO of SugarCRM until February 2019 when Craig Charlton was appointed the role, with. Augustin remaining the chairman of the board of directors.

As of July 2019, he became a VP at Amazon Web Services.

Personal life
Augustin works out in a gym every day after work. He is married and has a daughter born in 1997.

References

External links

Interviews
Audio interview on FLOSS Weekly
Interview on Slashdot
Interview on Linux Journal

American venture capitalists
Living people
Geeknet
Stanford University School of Engineering alumni
1962 births
American company founders
American technology chief executives
Open source advocates
Notre Dame College of Engineering alumni
People from New Hampshire